Bloomsbury Institute is a higher education provider in central London offering undergraduate and postgraduate degree courses in business management, accounting, and law. The Institute was founded in 2002 as the London School of Business and Management and adopted its current name in 2018.

In 2022, Bloomsbury Institute partnered with Glyndwr University to deliver undergraduate and postgraduate degrees. They re-designed their undergraduate degrees and launched a brand-new MBA and MSc in Management.

Prior to 2016, Bloomsbury Institute concentrated on delivering HND programmes, awarded by Pearson Education, after which it shifted to primarily offering degrees validated by the University of Northampton. The last recruitment onto HND courses was in September 2015 and the first recruitment onto the new BA courses was in January 2016.

Located in central London, Zone 1, Bloomsbury Institute students have access to University of London’s libraries and social spaces through a long-term relationship with Birkbeck College. The majority of teaching takes place at 373-375 Euston Road.

In 2022, Lord David Neuberger, Former President of the Supreme Court, opened Bloomsbury Institute’s Law Clinic, offering free legal advice to people who can’t afford a solicitor and do not qualify for legal aid. Initially focusing on Housing Law, the Clinic is run by academics from the Institute’s Law Faculty and local solicitors. Bloomsbury Institute students can also volunteer at the Clinic, as Law Clinic Advisors.

Bloomsbury Institute launched an in-house radio station, Bloomsbury Radio, in 2020. The station broadcasts a range of programmes and provides opportunities for students who wish to train as presenters as well as off-air in production, scheduling and compliance.

In 2020, Bloomsbury Institute won a landmark case against the Office for Students. In August 2020, the Court of Appeal overturned the Office for Students’ decision to not include Bloomsbury Institute on the register of providers, and ordered the Office for Students to reconsider Bloomsbury's application for registration.

Bloomsbury Institute is partnered with Unlock, as part of their 'Ban the Box' campaign. In 2019, they became the first higher education provider in the UK to no longer ask anyone wishing to study at the Institute to disclose past criminal convictions.

Bloomsbury Institute is regularly reviewed by the Quality Assurance Agency. The last full review, in October 2015, noted that there had been a change of validator for degree programmes from the University of South Wales and Cardiff Metropolitan University to the University of Northampton. The review found that the institute met UK expectations for the maintenance of academics standards, for the quality of student learning opportunities and for the quality of information about learning opportunities, and commended the institute for its enhancement of student learning opportunities. A monitoring visit in 2016 find that all recommendations of the 2015 report had been implemented in full. It also noted that the new admissions policy in place from February 2016 was "underpinned by a commitment to fair access", and that 65% of students were from black and ethnic minorities background and 20% declared a disability.

References

External links 

Business schools in England
Higher education colleges in London
Educational institutions established in 2002
2002 establishments in England